This article lists the confirmed squads for the 2017 Men's Hockey Africa Cup of Nations tournament held in Ismailia, Egypt between 
22 to 29 October 2017. The eight national teams were required to register a playing squad of eighteen players and two reserves.

Egypt
The following was the Egypt squad for the 2017 Africa Cup of Nations.

Head coach: Ali Elshorbagy

Ghana
The following was the Ghana squad for the 2017 Africa Cup of Nations.

Head coach: Winfred Sackey

Kenya
The following was the Kenya squad for the 2017 Africa Cup of Nations.

Head coach: Meshack Senge

Nigeria
The following was the Nigeria squad for the 2017 Africa Cup of Nations.

Head coach: Babatunde Odedokun

South Africa
The following was the South Africa squad for the 2017 Africa Cup of Nations.

Head coach: Sheldon Rostron

References

Men's Hockey Africa Cup of Nations